Justus Steinberger, (1825–1870) was Colonel of the 1st Regiment Washington Territory Volunteer Infantry during the American Civil War.  Born in Pennsylvania,  before the Civil War he was employed as agent for the Pacific Mail Steamship Company, and the Adams Express Company in Portland, Oregon.  On October 12, 1861 he was appointed as colonel, with authority to raise a regiment in Washington Territory and California.  From May 5, 1862 - July 7, 1862 he was the commander of the District of Oregon.  After the war he was given a commission as a major in the regular army in 1866, serving in the pay department.  He was killed by being thrown from his horse at Helena, Montana, October 13, 1870, and was buried at Fort Shaw.

References

1870 deaths
American people of the Indian Wars
People of Oregon in the American Civil War
People of Washington (state) in the American Civil War
1826 births